Ângelo Mariano de Almeida (born 12 June 1981) more commonly known as Ângelo, is a Brazilian footballer who plays for Montescaglioso Calcio. He is able to play both as a full-back and a defensive midfielder.

Career
Ângelo started his football career in native Brazil playing with Corinthians for three seasons. Then he moved to São Caetano, where he spent one season, and to Criciúma, for another season. During January 2005 in the winter session of Serie A, he was brought to Lecce, spending much of this season on loan at Crotone in Serie B.

As Zdeněk Zeman, the man who signed Ângelo, returned to Lecce for a second managerial spell, he ordered that the player return to Lecce in the summer of 2006. In 2006–2007 season he suffered from a serious injury at his knee, which he recovered from in the last matchdays of the championship.

At the end of the 2009–10 season, he was released by Lecce. On 2 September 2010, he was signed by Parma on a free transfer, but played a bit-part role as something of a utility player. He moved to Siena the following summer for €2.5 million along with the remain 50% rights of Reginaldo were exchanged with outright deal of Daniele Galloppa also for €5 million.

On 15 July 2015, he was signed by Foggia. On 30 August 2017, he joined Matera.

Montescaglioso Calcio announced on 5 February 2019, that Ângelo had joined the club.

References

External links
http://www.gazzetta.it/speciali/serie_b/2008_nw/giocatori/80608.shtml
http://www.gazzetta.it/speciali/2008/calcio/Players/player_p61748.shtml

http://www.tuttomercatoweb.com/lega-pro/foggia-e-fatta-per-angelo-697399

1981 births
Living people
Brazilian footballers
Brazil under-20 international footballers
Brazilian expatriate footballers
Sport Club Corinthians Paulista players
Associação Desportiva São Caetano players
Criciúma Esporte Clube players
U.S. Lecce players
F.C. Crotone players
Parma Calcio 1913 players
A.C.N. Siena 1904 players
Latina Calcio 1932 players
Calcio Foggia 1920 players
Matera Calcio players
Serie A players
Serie B players
Serie C players
Expatriate footballers in Italy
Association football defenders
Sportspeople from Salvador, Bahia